Galali may refer to:

People and languages
Galali people, an Indigenous Australian people in Queensland
Kalali language or Galali, a variety of the Bulloo River language
Galali, a variety of the Wilson River language

Places
Galali, Bahrain, an area of Muharraq Island
Gelali (disambiguation), several places in Iran also known as Galali